The Tony Award for Best Author is a now retired category once presented to playwrights, authors and librettists of theatrical plays and musicals. Only nine awards were presented from 1947 to 1965, and it is often grouped with the category Best Book of a Musical.

Winners and nominees

1940s

1960s

See also
 Drama Desk Award for Outstanding Book of a Musical
 Tony Award for Best Book of a Musical

External links
 Tony Awards Official site
 Tony Awards at Internet Broadway database Listing
 Tony Awards at broadwayworld.com

Tony Awards
Awards established in 1947
1947 establishments in the United States
1965 disestablishments in the United States